WJET (1400 kHz) branded as Jet Radio 1400 is a commercial AM radio station in Erie, Pennsylvania. It broadcasts a talk radio format and is owned by iHeartMedia, Inc.  WJET's studios are in the Boston Store building in downtown Erie.

WJET has a power of 1,000 watts.  The transmitter is at the intersection of East 18th Street and Ash Street in the city of Erie.  Programming is also heard on 250-watt FM translator W244DX at 96.7 MHz.

Programming
WJET primarily runs conservative talk hosts from the co-owned Premiere Networks.  Weekdays begin with a local news and information show, Erie Talk in the Morning, hosted by Barry Dain Steinhagen. The rest of the schedule is made up of nationally syndicated shows: The Glenn Beck Program, The Sean Hannity Show, The Clay Travis and Buck Sexton Show, The Jesse Kelly Show, The Joe Pags Show, Coast to Coast AM with George Noory and America in the Morning with John Trout.

Weekends include Kim Komando, Free Talk Live, Bill Handel on the Law, Money Talk with Bob Brinker, Mike Gallager and iHeartRadio Podcast Premiere. Under previous ownership, The Rush Limbaugh Show was dropped in December 2008 after Premiere Networks demanded higher fees from WJET's owner to carry Limbaugh. It was immediately restored when iHeartMedia assumed ownership of the radio station in 2019.

History
In , WJET signed on the air.  It was powered at only 250 watts and its studios were at 1635 Ash Street, where its transmitter is located to this day.  For much of its early history, the station was owned by WJET, Inc., a subsidiary of Myron Jones Stations.

During the 1960s and 1970s, WJET had a Top 40 format, playing the big hits of the day.  But by the 1980s, most music listening had shifted from AM to FM stations.  In 1986, WJET Broadcasting bought an FM station at 102.3 MHz, and shifted its Top 40 format to that station, giving it the WJET call sign.  AM 1400 became talk station WLKK, carrying programming from NBC Talknet and the Mutual Broadcasting System.

Connoisseur Media later bought WJET and WLKK.  In 2001, the WJET call letters returned to AM 1400.  FM 102.3 is now WQHZ, owned by Cumulus Media.

On March 27, 2019, Connoisseur Media announced that it would transfer WJET and WLKK to iHeartMedia in exchange for WFRE and WFMD in the Frederick, Maryland, radio market.  WFRE and WFMD were part of the Aloha Station Trust. The sale closed on May 20, 2019.

In August 2021, the Erie Otters hockey team announced a radio partnership with WJET, beginning with the 2021-2022 OHL season.

FM translator

References

External links

JET
News and talk radio stations in the United States
IHeartMedia radio stations
Radio stations established in 1951
1951 establishments in Pennsylvania